Michael Dwyer (born September 16, 1957) is a Canadian former professional ice hockey forward.

Early life 
Dwyer was born in Brampton, Ontario. As a youth, he played in the 1970 Quebec International Pee-Wee Hockey Tournament with a minor ice hockey team from Toronto.

Career 
Dwyer was drafted by both the Colorado Rockies in the fifth round, 74th overall in the 1977 NHL Entry Draft and by the Houston Aeros in the 10th round, 82nd overall of the 1977 WHA Entry Draft.

Dwyer played 32 National Hockey League games for the Rockies and the Calgary Flames over parts of four seasons between 1978–79 and 1981–82, recording three goals and six assists. He spent much of his professional career playing for several teams in the Central Hockey League.

Career statistics

Regular season and playoffs

References

External links

1957 births
Living people
Birmingham Bulls (CHL) players
Calgary Flames players
Canadian ice hockey left wingers
Colorado Flames players
Colorado Rockies (NHL) draft picks
Colorado Rockies (NHL) players
Fort Worth Texans players
Hampton Gulls (AHL) players
Houston Aeros draft picks
Ice hockey people from Ontario
Niagara Falls Flyers players
Oklahoma City Stars players
Philadelphia Firebirds (AHL) players
Phoenix Roadrunners (CHL) players
Sportspeople from Brampton
Wichita Wind players
Windsor Spitfires players